The National Fascist Party of Argentina (Partido Nacional Fascista) was a fascist political party formed in 1923.

History 

The National Fascist Party was the first fascist party in Argentina , founded in 1923 . The basis for the emergence of this party, as well as similar parties in Europe, was the weakening of the role of society in the government of the country and the economic crises,In 1932, a group broke away from the party to form the Argentine Fascist Party, which eventually became a mass movement in the Córdoba region of Argentina.

References 

Fascism in Argentina
Defunct political parties in Argentina
Political parties established in 1923
1923 establishments in Argentina
Political parties with year of disestablishment missing